C.J. Latta was a British film executive best known for being managing director of Associated British Picture Corporation and Warner Bros cinemas. He helped establish the Variety Club. He was awarded with a CBE in 1964.

References

Warner Bros. people
British film producers